Nguyễn Quốc Việt (born May 4, 2003) is a Vietnamese professional footballer who plays as a striker for V.League 1 club Hoàng Anh Gia Lai, and the Vietnam national under-20 alongside under-23 football team.

Early career 
Born in Hải Phòng, Quốc Việt started his youth career at Hải Dương, playing for the Tran Hung Dao Middle School football team. In 2016, the team won the National U13 Cup organised in Đắk Lắk, with Quốc Việt being scouted by Guillaume Graechen and admitted directly to Hoang Anh Gia Lai – Arsenal JMG Academy after the final.

With Hoàng Anh Gia Lai, Quốc Việt finished as runner-up in Vietnamese National U-19 Football Championship for two years in a row: 2019 and 2020. Quốc Việt finished in both editions as top scorer by scoring respectively 2 and 3 goals during the final tournament. In 2020, he joined , a partner club of Hoàng Anh Gia Lai and played with the U17 team in the Vietnamese National U-17 Football Championship. Quốc Việt won the golden shoe by scoring 9 goals throughout the tournament, and lead his team to the final, where they were defeated by U17 Sông Lam Nghệ An.

At the age of 18, Quốc Việt participated in the 2021 Vietnamese National U-21 Football Championship. Despite his young age, Quốc Việt continued winning the top scorer title with 4 goals scored in the final tournamement, including the only goal that helped Nutifood beat U21 Hà Nội 1–0 in the final.

Club career 
In August 2021, Quốc Việt was loaned to PVF, who play in Vietnam National Championship Division 2. However, the 2021 season has been canceled by the Vietnam Football Federation due to the impact of the Covid-19 epidemic. The loan was extended until the 2022 season, with Quốc Việt making his debut for PVF against SHB Đà Nẵng Youth. At the end of the championship, PVF only finished seventh out of eight teams in their group, having scored only 8 goals in total.

In June 2022, Hoàng Anh Gia Lai's manager Kiatisuk Senamuang expressed his wish to integrate Quốc Việt to the team. The player had previously played for Nutifood and PVF earlier that season, making the move impossible at the moment because FIFA rules forbid a player from playing for more than 2 clubs in the same season. Quốc Việt remained at Nutifood until the end of the season and played in the 2022 Vietnamese Football League Third Division.

On 6 December 2022, it was confirmed that Quốc Việt will join Hoang Anh Gia Lai from the 2023 season.

International career 
In January 2022, Quốc Việt was named in Vietnam U23's squad to participate in the 2022 AFF U-23 Youth Championship in Cambodia. Quốc Việt took part in Vietnam's victory against Thailand U23 and Singapore U23 in the group stage before being ruled out of the squad for the rest of the tournament for being tested positive to Covid-19. Vietnam were later crowned as champions after defeating Thailand U23 in the final.

Quốc Việt participated in the 2022 AFF U-19 Youth Championship. He scored 4 goals in the group stage, helping Vietnam U19 finishing as group winner. In the semi-final, Quốc Việt and his teammates lost against Malaysia U19. Quốc Việt scored the equalizer goal in the third place match against Thailand U19, which leads the match in the penalty shootout, where Vietnam U19 won 5–3 and secured the bronze medal. With 5 goals scored, Quốc Việt received the top scorer award.

Playing style 
Quốc Việt possesses the skills of a modern goalscorer with a great pace, technique, positioning and finishing ability with his feet as well as with his head. He is called the "King of youth competitions" by Vietnamese media with a series of individual and team titles that he won in youth competitions. His style similars with Anderson Talisca.

Honours
Nutifood JMG Academy
 Vietnamese National U-21 Football Championship: 2021
Vietnam U23
 AFF U-23 Youth Championship: 2022
Vietnam U19
 AFF U-19 Youth Championship: Third place: 2022
 International U-19 Thanh Niên Newspaper Cup: 2022

Individual
 Vietnamese National U-19 Football Championship top scorer: 2019, 2020, 2021
 Vietnamese National U-17 Football Championship top scorer: 2020
 Vietnamese National U-17 Football Championship best player: 2020
 Vietnamese National U-21 Football Championship best player: 2021
 Vietnamese National U-21 Football Championship top scorer: 2021
 AFF U-19 Youth Championship top scorer: 2022

References 

Living people
2003 births
Vietnamese footballers
Association football forwards
Long An FC players